The Monte Duida tree frog (Tepuihyla aecii) is a species of frog in the family Hylidae. It is endemic to Venezuela and only known from the Cerro Duida, its type locality in the Amazonas state of southern Venezuela. Its natural habitat is montane tepui vegetation, specifically forest and shrubs adjacent to rivers, streams, and peat bogs. No significant threats to this species occurring in the Duida-Marahuaca National Park are known.

References

Tepuihyla
Endemic fauna of Venezuela
Amphibians of Venezuela
Amphibians described in 1992
Taxa named by Josefa Celsa Señaris
Taxonomy articles created by Polbot
Amphibians of the Tepuis